Alfons Riedel (31 July 1901 – 1 April 1969) was an Austrian sculptor. His work was part of the sculpture event in the art competition at the 1936 Summer Olympics.

References

1901 births
1969 deaths
20th-century Austrian sculptors
Austrian male sculptors
Olympic competitors in art competitions
Artists from Vienna
20th-century Austrian male artists